In mathematical analysis, Lorentz spaces, introduced by George G. Lorentz in the 1950s, are generalisations of the more familiar  spaces.

Like the  spaces, they are characterized by a norm (technically a quasinorm) that encodes information about the "size" of a function, just as the  norm does. The two basic qualitative notions of "size" of a function are: how tall is the graph of the function, and how spread out is it. The Lorentz norms provide tighter control over both qualities than the  norms, by exponentially rescaling the measure in both the range and the domain. The Lorentz norms, like the  norms, are invariant under arbitrary rearrangements of the values of a function.

Definition
The Lorentz space on a measure space  is the space of complex-valued measurable functions  on X such that the following quasinorm is finite

 

Thus, when ,

and, when ,

It is also conventional to set .

Decreasing rearrangements
The quasinorm is invariant under rearranging the values of the function , essentially by definition.  In particular, given a complex-valued measurable function  defined on a measure space, its decreasing rearrangement function,  can be defined as

Here, for notational convenience,  is defined to be .

where  is the Lebesgue measure on the real line.

Lorentz sequence spaces
When  (the counting measure on ), the resulting Lorentz space is a sequence space.  However, in this case it is convenient to use different notation.

Definition.
Denote by  the Banach space of all sequences with finite p-norm. Let  the Banach space of all sequences satisfying , endowed with the ∞-norm. Denote by  the normed space of all sequences with only finitely many nonzero entries.

Let  be a sequence of positive real numbers satisfying , and define the norm . The Lorentz sequence space  is defined as the Banach space of all sequences where this norm is finite. Equivalently, we can define  as the completion of  under .

Properties
Further,  coincides with weak .
 
 

whose  quasi-norm equals one, whereas the quasi-norm of their sum  equals four.

The space  is contained in  whenever .

Hölder's inequality

Dual space

Atomic decomposition
(i) . 
(v)  almost everywhere, where .

See also 
 Interpolation space
 Hardy–Littlewood inequality

References
.

Notes

Banach spaces
Lp spaces